William Robert Fitzgerald Collis (1900–1975) was an Irish doctor and writer. As an author he was known as Robert Collis. As a doctor, he was commonly known as Dr Bob Collis. Maurice Collis was his elder brother. John Stewart Collis was his twin brother.

Life
He was born at Killiney, County Dublin. He joined the British Army in 1918 as a cadet, but resigned a year later to study medicine. He was appointed Director of the Department of Paediatrics at the Rotunda Hospital, Dublin, and in 1932 physician to the National Children's Hospital, Harcourt Street. He developed neo-natal services at the Rotunda, particularly for premature babies.

He worked for the Red Cross in the Bergen-Belsen concentration camp after its liberation by Allied troops. He was instrumental in bringing five orphaned children from the camp to Ireland in 1947, and adopted two of them. He met a Dutch nurse in Bergen Belsen, Han Hogerzeil, whom he later married, after divorcing his first wife.

He was involved in establishing Cerebral Palsy Ireland. One of his first patients was Christy Brown, a cerebral palsy patient who later became a notable author himself. Collis proofread Brown's first attempt at an autobiography.

The writer John Stewart Collis was his twin and Maurice Collis, writer and biographer, was his elder brother.

Works
He wrote the play Marrowbone Lane and an autobiography The Silver Fleece, both in 1939. The book Straight On (1947), with Han Hogerzeil, whom he later married, recounts the liberation of Belsen. Other books included The Ultimate Value (1951) about the refugee children, A Doctor’s Nigeria (1960), and To Be a Pilgrim (1975).

References

1900 births
1975 deaths
Irish writers
Irish pediatricians
People from Killiney